The Cedar Sinai Synagogue is a Modern Orthodox Jewish synagogue located in Lyndhurst, Ohio.

History

In 1957, Tetiever Ahavath Achim Anshe Sfard (1909) forms Warrensville Center Synagogue; in 1959, Kinsman Jewish Center (1930) and N'Vai Zedek (1922) merge with Warrensville Center Synagogue.  In 1970, Sherith Jacob (1899) and Sherith Israel (1922) agree to join Warrensville.

In 1959, Ohel Jacob (1915) and Ohel Yavne (1919) merge to form Shaker-Lee Synagogue; in 1962, Tifereth Israel (1920) joins Shaker-Lee Synagogue.  In 1972, Shaker-Lee agrees to merge with Warrensville Center Synagogue.

In the early-2000s, renamed Cedar Rd. Synagogue moves from Warrensville Rd. to Cedar Rd. in Lyndhurst, and in 2012 Sinai Synagogue merges with Cedar Rd. Synagogue to form Cedar Sinai Synagogue.

In 2012, Cedar Sinai's attempt to merge with Oheb Zedek - Taylor Road Synagogue (1904) to form Oheb Zedek-Cedar Sinai Synagogue failed, and a settlement between the two was agreed upon in 2014.

References

"Cleveland Jewish News article"

External links
 Official website

Modern Orthodox synagogues in the United States
Orthodox synagogues in Ohio